Club Deportivo Papa Francisco is a semi-professional football club based in San Francisco Solano in Buenos Aires Province which plays in the Liga Lujanense, one of the regional leagues that combine to form the quinta division of the Argentine football league system. It has been affiliated with the Argentine Football Association since December 2013 after being conceived in October of the same year.

The club is named after current Pope Francis, who was Archbishop of Buenos Aires before his election as Pope in March 2013. It currently does not have any official association with the Pope.

The club's motto is 'no hooligans, no violence and no insults' and seeks to denounce violence and hooliganism which are prevalent in Argentine football.

History
The club played its first match on 12 April 2014 against local side Trefules.  The match drew international attention after two players from CDPF were sent off during the match despite the club's promotion of nonviolence in the sport.

References

2013 establishments in Argentina
Association football clubs established in 2013
Football clubs in Buenos Aires Province